Most of Romania's tunnels date from the 20th century in the building of the railways, typically excavated through rock by blasting and then hand excavation.

The more modern tunnels include the longer Bucharest metro tunnels and utility tunnels, constructed from approximately 1970 to date, using a variety of tunnelling methods.

Road tunnels

Rail tunnels

Other tunnels

See also
 List of tunnels by location

References

Tunnels
Lists of tunnels
Tunnels